is a Japanese former sprinter who competed in the 2000 Summer Olympics.

Personal bests

Records
100 metres
Former Japanese university record holder - 10.11 s (wind: +0.3 m/s) (Tokyo, 2 September 2000)
Medley relay (100m×200m×300m×400m)
Current Japanese record holder - 1:48.27 s (relay leg: 1st) (Yokohama, 15 September 2001)

 with Nobuharu Asahara, Kenji Tabata, and Jun Osakada

International competition record

References

External links
 

1978 births
Living people
Japanese male sprinters
Olympic athletes of Japan
Athletes (track and field) at the 2000 Summer Olympics
Universiade medalists in athletics (track and field)
Universiade gold medalists for Japan
Medalists at the 2001 Summer Universiade
20th-century Japanese people
21st-century Japanese people